Marstein Lighthouse is an active lighthouse in the municipality of Austevoll, in Vestland county, Norway. It is located on the small island of Store Marstein just west of the island of Stora Kalsøy on the south side of the entrance to the Korsfjorden and therefore assists ships going to both the city of Bergen and to the Hardangerfjorden.

Description
It emits a white and red isophase light with a period of 4 seconds.

History

The original octagonal prism-shaped lighthouse was built on this site in 1877.  During World War II, the island and lighthouse were occupied by German forces. Allied aircraft bombed the lighthouse on two occasions, 25 July and 1 August 1940, and caused considerable damage.  From 1949 to 1950, a new square light tower, a new keeper's house, and a new surrounding, protective, bulkhead were built.

The lighthouse was automated in 1987 and in 2002 the lighthouse keeper position was eliminated and the lighthouse is now controlled electronically from the mainland. In January 2005, a severe storm breached the bulkhead wall and destroyed the keeper's house. After the keeper's house was repaired its ownership was transferred to the local Austevoll municipality. A hotel now operates the facility as a dependency.

The newspaper Marsteinen was named after the lighthouse in 1978.

See also
Lighthouses in Norway
List of lighthouses in Norway

References

External links

 Norsk Fyrhistorisk Forening 

Austevoll
Lighthouses completed in 1877
Lighthouses in Vestland
1877 establishments in Norway